Peter James Stapleton (25 April 1954 – 22 March 2020) was a musician from New Zealand who was best known as the drummer and co-founder of the alternative rock band The Terminals. Stapleton was also a member of the groups Vacuum, The Pin Group,  Dadamah, Flies Inside The Sun, Eye, and Scorched Earth Policy.

Career
Stapleton was principally a drummer, although he also contributed shortwave radio and sample manipulations to various recordings.

In 1976 Stapleton joined Vacuum, who went largely unrecorded. The band consisted of Stapleton, Bill Direen, Steve Cogle, Peter Fryer and, later replacing Fryer, Alan Meek. When Vacuum split, Bill Direen went on to form The Bilders, while Stapleton, Cogle, Tony O'Grady and Meek, along with singer/songwriter Mary Heney transformed into The Victor Dimisich Band, which released its first self-titled EP on the Flying Nun label in 1982. The Victor Dimisich Band disbanded, and posthumously released a cassette, Mekong Delta Blues, on the Xpressway label in 1988. Stapleton and Cogle went on to form The Terminals in 1986.

Stapleton also formed The Pin Group with Roy Montgomery and Ross Humphries. Their 1981 "Ambivalence" 7-inch was the first release on the Flying Nun label. Another 7-inch, "Coat" was issued later that year, followed by The Pin Group Go To Town EP in 1982. The Pin Group then disbanded, yet reunited in 1992 for the "Eleven Years After" 7-inch. A compilation of these recordings was released in 1997 on the Siltbreeze label, and later in expanded form on Flying Nun.

Stapleton formed the garage rock band Scorched Earth Policy, who released two EPs; Dust to Dust (1984) and Going Through a Hole in the Back of Your Head (1985). These recordings were later compiled and reissued on the Medication label as Keep Away From The Wires, and on the Siltbreeze label as Going Thru' A Hole in the Back of Your Head.

During the 1990s, Stapleton moved into more experimental noise music, forming bands such as Dadamah, Flies Inside The Sun, and Sleep. In 1996 he founded the Metonymic and Medication record labels. From 2003 until his death, he played in Dunedin improvised psychedelic noise rock trio Eye.

Stapleton died in Dunedin on 22 March 2020.

References

External links
Biography at New Zealand Electronic Poetry Centre
An interview with Peter Stapleton
An interview with The Terminals
Interview with Peter Stapleton (parts 1 – 3)
Interview with Peter Stapleton (parts 4 & 5)
Interview with Peter Stapleton (parts 6 – 8)
Interview with Peter Stapleton (parts 9 and 10)

1954 births
2020 deaths
New Zealand drummers
Musicians from Dunedin